Chris Dyer (born 12 February 1968) is the head of Vehicle Performance Group at Renault Sport Formula 1 Team and the former race engineer of Michael Schumacher and Kimi Räikkönen at the Ferrari Formula One team.

Early career
Born in Bendigo, Victoria, Dyer worked with the top V8 Supercar outfit, the Tom Walkinshaw owned Holden Racing Team in the mid nineties alongside drivers such as Peter Brock and Craig Lowndes. In 1997, he switched to Walkinshaw's Formula One team Arrows, working as Damon Hill's chief data engineer. In 1998, he stepped up to race engineering, working with drivers such as Jos Verstappen.

Ferrari
For the 2001 season, Dyer moved to Scuderia Ferrari, working as Michael Schumacher's vehicle engineer, alongside Luca Baldisserri. By the end of 2002, Dyer engineered Schumacher at the tests, and after the championships had been won, at the last three races at Monza, Indianapolis and Suzuka. Dyer then race engineered Michael Schumacher to his 2003 and 2004 world titles, appearing with the German on the podium after his triumph at the 2003 Canadian Grand Prix. Dyer was quoted saying that 'One of Michael's strengths is that, apart from driving quickly, he has an understanding of the car and how all the systems work'.

Dyer then took over as Kimi Räikkönen's race engineer when the Finn moved to Ferrari in 2007. Despite suggestions that the pair didn't always get the most from the package, Räikkönen took the title in 2007 at the final race by a single point over Lewis Hamilton and Fernando Alonso. However, after the disappointing results in the 2008 season, Ferrari announced that Dyer would be replaced by Andrea Stella for the 2009 season, with Dyer promoted to chief track engineer.

On 4 January 2011 Ferrari announced that Dyer was replaced as head of race track engineering by former McLaren engineer Pat Fry. This decision was taken after Dyer made the call to bring Fernando Alonso into the pits to cover off the Australian Mark Webber's pit stop in the final 2010 race, at Abu Dhabi. This decision was blamed for costing Alonso the drivers title, in favour of Sebastian Vettel who went on to become champion. In October 2012 it was announced that Dyer was to join BMW's DTM programme as chief engineer.

Renault
On 4 February 2016 it was announced by Renault Sport that Dyer would be returning to F1 as their head of vehicle performance group.

Career
1997: Arrows Data Engineer
1998-2000: Arrows Race Engineer
2001-2002: Scuderia Ferrari Vehicle Engineer
2003-2006: Scuderia Ferrari Race Engineer, Michael Schumacher
2007-2008: Scuderia Ferrari Race Engineer, Kimi Räikkönen
2009-2011: Scuderia Ferrari Chief Track Engineer
2011-2012: Scuderia Ferrari team member
2012–2015: BMW Deutsche Tourenwagen Masters Chief Engineer
2016–present: Renault Sport F1 Team Head of Vehicle Performance Group

References

Living people
Ferrari people
Formula One engineers
1968 births
Australian engineers
Australian motorsport people
Data engineers